The Vigili del Fuoco is Italy's institutional agency for fire and rescue service. It is part of the Ministry of Interior's Dipartimento dei Vigili del Fuoco, del Soccorso Pubblico e della Difesa Civile (Department of Firefighters, Public Rescue and Civil(ian) Protection). The Corps' task is to provide safety for people, animals, and property, and to give technical assistance to industries, as well as providing fire prevention advice. It also ensures public safety in terrorist emergencies such as chemical, bacteriological, radiological, and nuclear attacks.

The word Vigili comes from the Latin word Vigiles, which means "who is part of certain guards". The complete official name is Corpo Nazionale dei Vigili del Fuoco (CNVVF, National Firefighters Corps).

History

The first public firefighting organization in the world was probably the "Vigiles", a military structured body with fire control and rescue duties that protected the city of Rome in the early centuries A.C. Two stations can be still visited in Rome (The "VII Coorte" and the "Ostia Antica" barracks). Their name has been adopted some 19 century later for the new Italian national firefighters organisation.
During the Calabrian-Sicilian earthquake in 1908, fire brigades from different Italian towns had faced many problems caused by lack of coordination in equipment and operative instructions.  
The Fascist government, via the Ministry of the Interior, commissioned the design and creation of a unified fire protection body to Albert Giombini (born in Jesi on 18 July 1898). The Vigili del Fuoco, established in 1941, merged all the fire protection bodies previously existing in various towns and countries. The body played an important role in relieving the civilian population affected by bombing.
In 1942 the "Santa Barbara Battalion" was created after the Italians' retreat from Russia, and the defeat in the Battle of El Alamein. In this phase of the war, the German-Italian Allies planned to invade the island of Malta, then a British possession, using the ladders of the fire brigade, to be mounted on mine-layers. The soldiers (in this plan) could walk the ladders up to the island's territory. Giombini secretly asked all the 94 corps for a list of volunteers; it was necessary a strict selection for the manpower recruiting since the answers were numerous .

The operation, called "C3" by Italians and "Herkules" by Germans, however, was abruptly cancelled in October 1942, and the Battalion was disbanded. In early November, under increasing Anglo-American bombing raids on Italian towns, the men were divided into five groups, each with 100 men, and sent in the cities hardest hit by enemy bombs (Turin, Genoa, Rome, Naples, Milan) to aid the local Fire Commands. The ladders were returned to the Commands and the men who had been part of the Battalion were authorized to wear on the uniform the special badge of the "Santa Barbara".

In 1989 the National Fire Corps was awarded the appointment of "goodwill ambassador" by the Italian Committee for 'UNICEF'. "Yes for Children", a manifesto for children's rights, is one of the campaigns it took part in.

In 2016 the Corp was awarded by the "Conrad Dietrich Magirus Award", the most important international firefighters contest in the world. The Italy's fire department were honoured as "International Firefighting Team of the Year" with this motivation: "Earthquake helpers are distinguished for extraordinary performance and teamwork".

Operational staff

Emergency teams work throughout the country. Detachments of Vigili del Fuoco in each province are controlled by a coordinating command authority. In response to emergency calls, local operation rooms decide on the level of response and type of equipment needed, and liaise with local police and other emergency services.
Operating personnel may be permanent or volunteer. The latter is distinguished by the presence of a white frieze on the badge of status.

Each team consists of 5 or 6 people and is coordinated by a team leader or by the fireman with the longest field experience. He is distinguished from other firefighters by the red frieze and the red helmet. The rest of the team consists of Vigili Permanenti or of volunteers with several years of "seniority".

Since 5 December 2005 the firefighters are no longer conscripts; citizens can subscribe to the civil service for a year. They are appointed to logistical and clerical services.

The head of the Department of Firefighters, Public Rescue and Public Protection is a prefect, appointed by the Minister of the Interior, who does not belong to the corps; the head of the CNVVF is a general manager from the body and wears a uniform.

Staff becomes operative after six months of physical and professional training in Rome. A special course entitles grants some firefighters to run emergency vehicles.

Operative staff has functions of judicial police, public safety, and fire prevention. The brigade's main task is to identify the causes of fires, in collaboration with other police forces.

"Discontinuous" volunteer fighters are former conscripts who have subscribed to the body, or citizens who have taken a specific course at the local Commands. Discontinuous volunteer brigades serve either at the Provincial Commands and local detachments, or at specific volunteer detachments.

Support staff
The Servizio Amministrativo Tecnico Informatico (Computer Technician Administrative Service), or SATI, supports the operational staff in all administrative and accounting tasks. It employs professionals with skills in computer science, electrical engineering, telecommunications.
SATI's personnel can be used in support of operational structures in places affected by major disasters or emergencies, where they assist operative staff. Each Command has IT specialists as administrators of the internal networks of the various Provincial, Regional and/or central offices, or as system analysts and programmers to develop the software used by the corps.

Specializations

NIA
Nucleo Investigativo Antincendio (Fire Investigation Unit): it studies, researches and analyzes the causes of fires, often upon specific request by judicial authorities.

NSSA
Nuclei di Soccorso Subacqueo ed Acquatico (Underwater and Water Rescue Units): they have 32 bases on the national territory, and help in risky situations related to water: fire aboard a ship carrying biological, chemical or nuclear weapons; search of persons at sea; flood emergencies. The divers can operate in unconventional places such as aqueducts, wells, sewers and waste water.

NH
Nucleo Elicotteri (Helicopter units): 12 helicopters grant air support to the groups on the ground for all types of interventions.

SAF
Speleo-Alpino-Fluviale (cave-alpine river). These rescuers are able to climb rock walls, descend into pits and caves, or tackle the currents of rivers. The same techniques are also used to reach steeples, roofs and top floors of skyscrapers where the normal ladders cannot be used. After earthquakes, they are employed to remove dangerous debris.

NCf
Nucleo Cinofili (Canine Units): they carry out search and rescue of all kinds, with the help of trained dogs.

Airport groups
This personnel presides over the safety at domestic airports. They are equipped with heavy duty vehicles equipped with cannons that shoot foam and powder.

Harbour groups
These units are equipped for rescue operations in sea, for fire on ships and in ports. The staff training is updated to keep pace with new technologies used in the marine field.

NBCR
Nuclear-Biological-Chemical-Radiological Units: they are prepared to work in the presence of dangerous substances (contamination by nuclear radiation, attacks with unconventional weapons, releases of hazardous substances such as gas or fuel as a result of accidents).

Radio repair group
They ensure the proper working of the communication system.

EMS
The group is composed of doctors and Fire Brigade personnel with TPSS (first aid techniques).

Equipment

Individual equipment

The basic fire-rescue kit of each firefighter consist of: protective helmet, fireproof balaclava, fireproof garments. For large quantities of smoke the fireman wears a breathing aid: a cylinder of compressed air with a facial mask that covers the entire face of the operator. It lasts an average of 20–25 minutes (200 bar), or higher, if at 300 atmospheres.

Technical equipment

Primary vehicles

 The most common is the APS, which stands for "autopompa serbatoio" (pump tank), used for fires, traffic accidents, etc. These means have specific equipment (hoses, hook ladder, retractor, saw, cutter, etc..) and a fair flow of water.
 The "autoscala" is a ladder vehicle used to reach high floors, trees, etc. It can reach heights of 20 mt up to 50 mt in larger vehicles.
 L'"autobotte pompa" (ABP) (pump) allows a big flow of water (about 8000lt.).

Nautical and port rescue
MBPs (pump motorboats) differ in speed, length, water flow: faster boats have a lower water flow, and vice versa. Speed varies from 12 to 50 knots.

Locations of the "Nuclei Portuali" (Harbour groups):
 Class I (ports of international importance): Ancona, Augusta, Cagliari, Genoa, Gioia Tauro, La Spezia, Livorno, Naples, Ravenna, Savona, Taranto, Trieste, Venice.
 Class II (ports of national importance): Bari, Brindisi, Catania, Civitavecchia, Messina, Palermo, Porto Torres;
 Class III (ports of regional and interregional importance): Gaeta, Trapani, Vibo Valentia.

Aviation

Twelve helicopter units are located at Alghero, Arezzo, Bari, Bologna, Catania, Genoa, Pescara, Salerno, Turin, Varese, Venice and at the Aviation Center of Rome Ciampino.

The helicopters now in use are:
 Agusta-Bell AB 412, used for transportation, rescue, fire extinguishing, etc.
 Agusta-Bell AB 206, used for reconnaissance services (monitoring and control).
 AgustaWestland AW109, gradually replacing the older AB 206.
Two twin-engine turboprop airplanes, Piaggio P180 Avanti II are located at Rome Ciampino.

Other equipment

The craft have visual signaling devices (flashing blue lights) and siren (electromechanic wail, also known as whistle or Hi-Lo).

Band
The Fire Service band was formed in the late 1930s, it consists of more than 60 members from various Provincial Commands of Italy. They perform at both official and unofficial ceremonies: parades, festivals, concerts, etc. All the performers have a diploma from a national Music School and are employed in regular service.

Rank system 
The current rank system dates from 2007, while the matching military styled insignia are from 2012.

Museums
 Villa Bellavista (Borgo a Buggiano)
 Carate Brianza
 Chiavenna
 Milano

See also
 Vigiles, the firefighters and police of Ancient Rome.
 Corps of Firefighters of the Vatican City State
 Gruppo Sportivo Fiamme Rosse

Notes and references

External links
 Official site
 Fire Prevention
 Associazione Vigili volontari Italia (Volunteer Fire Association)
 Port fire service of Augusta
The Conrad Dietrich Magirus Award